Loyasse Cemetery is a cemetery in the city of Lyon, France. The cemetery is located on the Fourvière hill in the western part of the city, not far away from the Metallic tower of Fourvière and Notre-Dame de Fourvière.

It is the 'richer' cemetery of Lyon, when compared with the Cimetière de La Guillotière, with elaborate graves in various architectural styles.

Notable interments
 Pierre Bossan, architect of the Basilica of Notre-Dame de Fourvière
 Ferdinand Ferber (1862–1909), French aviator.
 Émile Guimet (1836–1918), founder of the Guimet Museum
 Édouard Herriot (1872–1957), French Radical politician of the Third Republic who served three times as Prime Minister
 Létiévant (1830–1884), French surgeon remembered for drawing the first aesthesiography.
 Nizier Anthelme Philippe (1849–1905)
 Jean-Pierre Pléney
 Jean-Baptiste Willermoz

See also 
 List of cemeteries in France

Sources
 Pelletier, Jean, nd: Connaître son arrondissement: le 5e, pp. 58–50.  Éditions lyonnaise d'art et d'histoire

External links

 Cimetières de France et d'ailleurs (Philippe Landru): Lyon (69): cimetière de Loyasse 
 Lyon municipal website: Cimetière de Loyasse ancien 
 Lyon municipal website: Cimetière de Loyasse nouveau 
 

5th arrondissement of Lyon
Cemeteries in Lyon